"Release Me" is a song made by the Swedish indie pop group Oh Laura, released as a single in 2007. The single is first off in Oh Laura's debut album, A Song Inside My Head, a Demon in My Bed.

Oh Laura won the Sopot International Song Festival in 2008 with the song.

Remixes 
The Swedish band The Attic also recorded a remix of "Release Me" featuring Oh Laura. It appears in the EP Release Me, The Attic Remix that contains for remix tracks:
"Release Me" (The Attic Remix) (3:35)
"Release Me" (Remix) (3:43)
"Release Me" (The Attic Extended Remix) (8:01)
"Release Me" (Extended Remix) (7:14)

In popular culture
The song appeared in a Saab commercial for the Saab 9-3 car model, which was aired in Sweden, Norway, Poland, Spain, Ireland, France and the United Kingdom and later also in New Zealand and Australia.
Martin Halla sang the song in the semi-finals of The Voice – Norges beste stemme the inaugural season of the Norwegian The Voice. His version of "Release Me" peaked at number 7 on VG-lista, the Norwegian Singles Chart.

Charts
Oh Laura version

Martin Halla version

References 

2007 singles
2012 singles
Oh Laura songs
2007 songs